This List of Chernihiv full list of Sport Teams

Active Teams

References 

Sport teams
Ukraine sport-related lists